Barton-under-Needwood is a large village in the East Staffordshire district of Staffordshire, England. Situated a mile from the A38, and located between Burton upon Trent and Lichfield. It had a population of 4,225 at the 2011 census. It is also near to the Derbyshire village of Walton-on-Trent.

History 

The Tudor church of St James is a Grade II* listed building. It dates from 1517 and was built by Dr John Taylor, a native of the village, noted ecclesiastic, and chaplain to Henry VIII. It is built of stone with embattled parapets. The aisles were widened in the 19th century. It also has a clerestory and a polygonal apse. Both nave and chancel retain their original low pitched roofs. The church contains several monuments, notably including a 1691 alabaster mural monument to Joseph Sanders and a marble tablet to Edmund Antrobus (1732) and his wife (1728).

The village also has several shops and a village hall. Local infant/junior schools, and a larger secondary school are also located within the village: John Taylor High School, which serves Barton and the surrounding villages. It has seven pubs, six of which are owned by Marstons.

Barton also has a large marina complex on the Trent and Mersey Canal, home to some 300 narrow boats, with shops, a pub, a cinema and restaurants.

The village sports teams are based at the Holland Sports Club, which has facilities for cricket, football, rugby, tennis, netball and tug of war. The club is named after the Holland family who were resident in Barton for 600 years from the 14th century to the mid-1900s. The earliest recorded member of the family was Richard de Holland who was involved in the Battle of Burton Bridge in 1322 (see 'Records of the Holland Family' published by William Holland).

The tug of war team have won many national and international honours since forming in 1970 - including the title 'Guinness World Record Holders' for a record in Tug of War Endurance which was created in 2000, being selected to represent England at the 2008 World Tug of War Championships in Sweden, and winning a World Open Silver Medal at the 2010 Championships in Pretoria, South Africa, see TWIF records (World Governing Body) 'Tug of War International Federation'.

Barton has four churches: St James C of E, Methodist, Roman Catholic and Christadelphian.

The name of the village had "under Needwood" added in 1327 to distinguish it from the other Bartons in England. Needwood Forest was a large area of ancient woodland in Staffordshire which was largely lost at the end of the 18th century. In 1995 a written history of Barton-under-Needwood was produced by Steve Gardner, named "Under the Needwood Tree", with the assistance of a book committee. In 2001 Gardner published a sequel, "Life and Times in Barton", and in 2007 a further volume: "Memories of Old Barton".

Dunstall Hall is a stately home about a mile outside Barton in the hamlet of Dunstall. It is used as a conference centre and a venue for weddings.

Barton-under-Needwood Golf Club (now defunct) was founded in 1892. The club and course closed in the mid-1920s.

The UK's first Travelodge was opened in 1985 on the A38 just outside the village, by Thomas Cartwright.

Between the 2005 and 2010 General Elections, the Needwood ward of East Staffordshire Borough Council (in which Barton-under-Needwood is the main settlement) was transferred from the Burton Parliamentary constituency to Lichfield.

Notable residents

 John Sutton, 1st Baron Dudley KG (1400–1487) nobleman, diplomat and councillor of Henry VI, baptised in Barton
 John Taylor (c.1480–1534) first Master of the Rolls, ambassador to France for King Henry VIII, funded the building of St. James Church between 1517 and 1533 and John Taylor High School was named in his honor.
 Thomas Gisborne (1758–1846) an English Anglican priest, poet and curate of Barton from 1783 to 1820
 George Edward Anson (1812 – 1849 in Barton) a courtier and British politician from the Anson family. 
 Walter Lyon (1841 in Barton – 1918) an English cricketer who played for Cambridge University between 1861 and 1863
 Clement Charlton Palmer (1871 in Barton - 1944) cathedral organist in Canterbury Cathedral from 1908 to 1936
 Sir Stanley Clarke CBE, DL (1933 – 2004 in Barton) an English businessman, a self-made millionaire property developer, horse racing enthusiast and philanthropist
 Peter Hart (born in 1955) a British military historian who grew up in Barton
 Ben Salfield (born 1971 in Barton) an English lutenist, composer and teacher
 Brian Mills (born 1971) played 23 games for Port Vale and then taught Physics and Maths at John Taylor High School

See also
Listed buildings in Barton-under-Needwood

References

External links 

 The Parish Of Barton Under Needwood In Staffordshire - G.E.Carey
 Barton's Railway - G.E.Carey
 History Of Thomas Russell, Draper (1529-1593) And Barton Under Needwood School - G.E.Carey
 

Villages in Staffordshire
Borough of East Staffordshire